BS11 may refer to:
 BS11, a BS postcode area for Bristol, England
 BS11, a Nippon BS Broadcasting satellite television channel
 BS 11 Specifications and Sections of Flat Bottom Railway Rails, a British Standard
 Bonomi BS.11 Milano, a primary glider
 BS-11 Numerical 11 point box Pain scale
 BS-11 Don Inda, a Spanish Maritime Safety and Rescue Society tugboat	
BS 11, a Royal Lao Army Airborne Border Police Special Battalion